Parliamentary elections were held in Algeria on 26 February 1987. The country was a one-party state at the time, with the National Liberation Front (FLN) as the sole legal party. The FLN nominated 885 candidates for the 295 seats, with voters asked to express their preference by crossing out names on the ballot. Only 67 of the 132 incumbents who ran for re-election were successful.

Voter turnout was over 87%.

Results

References

Elections in Algeria
Algeria
1987 in Algeria
One-party elections
Election and referendum articles with incomplete results